Roberttown is a village, in the township of Liversedge in Kirklees, West Yorkshire, England and is historically, part of the West Riding of Yorkshire.

Industry 
For most of the 1980s and early 1990s Roberttown served as the Headquarters of Halewood International after the company headquarters relocated there from Horbury.

Religion

All Saints' is the local Anglican church. It is located on Church Road.

Education
Roberttown C of E Junior and Infant School stands on Church Road not far from All Saints' Church.

Sport
Liversedge Cricket Club have their ground in the village near the New Inn public house on Roberttown Lane. They play in the Central Yorkshire League.

See also
Listed buildings in Liversedge and Gomersal

References

Villages in West Yorkshire
Geography of Kirklees